The 2022 Chicago Fire FC season is the club's 27th year of existence, as well as their 25th in Major League Soccer. On November 24, 2021, the Fire announced Columbus Crew assistant coach Ezra Hendrickson as the new head coach, making him the tenth full-time head coach in club history. For the fifth straight season and 12th season in club history, the Fire failed to qualify for the MLS Cup Playoffs. The Fire would begin with an unbeaten record in their first four games (2-0-2), but would start a 10-game winless run where the club went 0-7-3 following their 3-1 victory over Sporting Kansas City on March 19. Following an international break from May 29 until June 17, the Fire then went 6-3-1 over their next ten games, which ultimately led them to a 2-5-3 record to finish the season. The club also lost to Union Omaha on penalties in the Third Round of the Open Cup, their worst ever performance in the competition. Despite failing to make the playoffs, goalkeeper Gabriel Slonina set the club record for clean sheets in a season with 12 following the Fire's 0-0 draw with the Columbus Crew on September 3. Slonina would be sold to Chelsea on August 2 for a club record fee, with a loan back for the remainder of the season. On the reverse, the Fire also signed Swiss midfielder Xherdan Shaqiri for a club-record fee on February 9.

Current squad 
Players signed as of August 5, 2022

Player movement

Returning, options, and new contracts

In

Loaned in

Out

Second team movement

Unsigned draft picks and trialists

Technical staff

Competitions

Major League Soccer

Eastern Conference table

Overall table

Results summary

Match results

Preseason

Regular season

U.S. Open Cup

International friendlies

Statistics 
Note: italics indicates a player who left during the season

Games played

Main starting XI 
This starting group is based on players who started in the indicated position more than any other player across all competitions.

Goalkeeping

Goals and assists

Cards

Awards

Man of the Match awards

MLS Team of the Week

MLS Player of the Week

Second team statistics 
Note: italics indicates a player who left during the season.

Games played

Goalkeeping

Goals and assists

National team callups 
NOTE: At the time of their options being declined, Francisco Calvo was with the Costa Rica national team, and Elliot Collier had been called up to the New Zealand national team. Neither are listed below.

References

External links 
 

Chicago Fire FC seasons
Chicago Fire Soccer Club
Chicago Fire
Chicago Fire